The Prostigmata is a suborder of mites belonging to the order Trombidiformes, which contains the "sucking" members of the "true mites" (Acariformes).

Many species are notorious pests on plants. Well-known examples of prostigmatan plant parasites are species of the gall mites (Eriophyidae, e.g. the redberry mite Acalitus essigi), Tarsonemidae (e.g. the cyclamen mite, Steneotarsonemus pallidus), and the spider mites of the Tetranychidae (e.g. the two-spotted spider mite, Tetranychus urticae).

Other Prostigmata live as parasites on vertebrates (e.g. Demodex mites of the Demodecidae) or invertebrates (e.g. Polydiscia deuterosminthurus of the Tanaupodidae or the honeybee tracheal mite, Acarapis woodi, of the Tarsonemidae). There are also some forms (e.g. Smarididae) that are predators of small invertebrates – including smaller Prostigmata – yet others have a more varied lifestyle (e.g. Tydeidae) or switch their food sources as they mature (e.g. Erythraeidae). The suborder also includes the family Halacaridae (marine mites).

Some of the Prostigmata parasitizing vertebrates are of medical relevance due to causing skin diseases in humans. These include for example harvest mites ("chiggers") of the Trombiculidae.

Description 
Prostigmata are usually 0.1-2 mm long, though some giant red velvet mites can reach 16 mm. They have a range of different body forms and colours. As mites, most of them have eight legs (six in their larval stage). However, the Eriophyoidea instead have four legs, all positioned at the front of a long, worm-like body. The name "Prostigmata" comes from mites of this group having spiracles (stigmata) on the prodorsum, usually between the chelicerae or on its lateral margins.

Habitat 
Many prostigmatans live in soil. These occur in soils as varied as agricultural fields, burned prairies, tidal marshlands, drained lake beds with algal blooms, and Antarctic soils.

Other prostigmatans are aquatic. The group includes Hydrachnidia, commonly known as the water mites. Hydrachnidia live in many kinds of freshwater habitats, including lentic (e.g. lakes, ponds), lotic (e.g. rivers, streams), springs and interstitial waters. Also in the Prostigmata are family Halacaridae, which are mostly marine.

Other habitats of Prostigmata include caves, algae, mosses, lichens, shrubs and trees.

Diet 
Prostigmata have a wide range of diets, including species that are predators, herbivores, fungivores, microbivores and parasites.

Among the soil-dwelling Prostigmata, the smaller predatory species have nematodes as an important part of their diet. They may also feed occasionally on fungi, piercing fungal hyphae using stylet chelicerae. Larger predatory species, such as members of Bdelloidea and Trombidoidea, feed on other arthropods or their eggs.

Systematics and taxonomy
The Prostigmata make up the bulk of the acariform clade Trombidiformes, which also contains the minor and quite ancient lineage Sphaerolichida. The trombidiform mites are possibly the most promising approach to untangle the systematics, taxonomy and phylogeny of the notoriously complex Acariformes. Trombidiformes and the other acariform clade, Sarcoptiformes, were formerly considered suborders but this does not allow for a sufficiently precise classification of the mites and is adjusted in more modern treatments.

They contain a few of the little-known "Endeostigmata" – apparently an assemblage of several specialized but unrelated lineages – which for the most part appear to be Sarcoptiformes however. In addition, the Trombidiformes include the bulk of the presumed group of mites called "Actinedida". This taxon is still commonly encountered in systematic treatments. However, modern cladistic studies time and again fail to find any monophyletic group corresponding to the "Actinedida". Thus, they appear to be an evolutionary grade rather than an evolutionary lineage, united not by their apomorphies but by the lack of such characters that have evolved after the Acariformes separated from the Parasitiformes. Thus, the "Actinedida" seem to be a massively paraphyletic "wastebin taxon", uniting all Acariformes that are not "typical" Oribatida and Astigmata.

The Prostigmata present their own taxonomic and systematic problems even in the redefined monophyletic delimitation. They are variously subdivided into the Anystina and Eleutherengona, and Eupodina. The delimitation and interrelationships of these groups are entirely unclear; while most analyses find one of the latter two but not the other to be a subgroup of the Anystina, neither of these mutually contradicting hypotheses is very robust; possibly this is a simple error because phylogenetic software usually fails in handling non-dichotomous phylogenies. Consequently it may be best for the time being to consider each of the three main prostigmatan lineages to be equally distinct from the other two, not including either Eleutherengona or Eupodina in the Anystina in accord with the traditional view – the suborder Anystina are here considered the largest possible clade containing the Anystidae but no taxon assigned to the other two suborders.

Currently accepted taxonomy 
, Catalogue of Life and Integrated Taxonomic Information System accept the following taxonomy for Prostigmata, including four infraorders:

Anystina
 Superfamily Adamystoidea
 Superfamily Allotanaupodoidea
 Superfamily Amphotrombioidea
 Superfamily Anystoidea
 Superfamily Arrenuroidea
 Superfamily Caeculoidea
 Superfamily Calyptostomatoidea
 Superfamily Chyzerioidea
 Superfamily Erythraeoidea
 Superfamily Eylaoidea
 Superfamily Hydrachnoidea
 Superfamily Hydrovolzioidea
 Superfamily Hydryphantoidea
 Superfamily Hygrobatoidea
 Superfamily Lebertioidea
 Superfamily Paratydeoidea
 Superfamily Pomerantzioidea
 Superfamily Stygothrombioidea
 Superfamily Tanaupodoidea
 Superfamily Trombiculoidea
 Superfamily Trombidioidea
 Superfamily Yurebilloidea

Eleutherengona
(Also known as Eleutherengonides)
 Superfamily Cheyletoidea
 Superfamily Cloacaroidea
 Superfamily Dolichocyboidea
 Superfamily Heterocheyloidea
 Superfamily Myobioidea
 Superfamily Pterygosomatoidea
 Superfamily Pyemotoidea
 Superfamily Raphignathoidea
 Superfamily Scutacaroidea
 Superfamily Tarsocheyloidea
 Superfamily Tarsonemoidea
 Superfamily Tetranychoidea
 Superfamily Trochometridioidea

Eupodina
 Superfamily Bdelloidea
 Superfamily Eriophyoidea
 Superfamily Eupodoidea
 Superfamily Halacaroidea
 Superfamily Tydeoidea

Labidostommatina
 Superfamily Labidostommatoidea: monotypic family Labidostommatidae

References

External links 

 Prostigmata - an overview | ScienceDirect Topics

Trombidiformes
Arthropod suborders